The 2011–12 Leyton Orient F.C. season was the 113th season in the history of Leyton Orient Football Club, their 96th in the Football League, and sixth consecutive season in the third tier of the English football league system. The club finished the season one place above the relegation zone.

Squad
On 8 September 2011, it was announced that striker Jake Argent had been forced to retire from football at the age of 19, due to an anterior cruciate ligament injury shortly after signing his first professional contract in July 2010, during a pre-season friendly match against Cambridge United. Argent had attempted to return to playing twice, in January and July 2011, but he suffered further cartilage damage. He was unable to make any first team appearances for Leyton Orient, apart from two friendlies against Cambridge and St Albans City in July 2010.

On 17 November 2011, defender Elliott Omozusi was convicted of intimidating a witness in a murder trial, and was sentenced to two and a half years in prison. His Orient contract was subsequently terminated.

Playing staff
Statistics include only League, FA Cup and League Cup appearances and goals (complete to the end of the 2011–12 season)

Transfers

2010–11 squad statistics

Figures in brackets indicate appearances as a substitute
Players in italics are loan players

Top scorers

Results

Pre-season friendlies

League One

Results by round

FA Cup

League Cup

Football League Trophy

League One final table

References

Leyton Orient F.C. seasons
Leyton Orient